Antila is a Finnish surname. Notable people with the surname include:

 John Antila (1902-1969), American businessman and politician
 Juho Erkki Antila (1856–1920), Finnish politician
 Kirsi Antila (née Välimaa, born 1978), Finnish cross-country skier
 Kristian Antila (born 1980), Finnish ice hockey goaltender
 Marko Antila (born 1969), Finnish film producer and director
 Pentti Antila (1926–1997), Finnish agronomist and politician
 Timo Antila (born 1980), Finnish biathlete

Finnish-language surnames
Surnames of Finnish origin